These are the squad listings for the men's teams at the 2017 Central American Games.

Belize
Head coach:  Richard Orlowski

Costa Rica
Head coach:  Mauricio Herrera

Nicaragua
Head coach:  Mario Alfaro

El Salvador
Head coach:  Eduardo Lara

Honduras
Head coach:  Carlos Tábora

Panama

Head coach:   Jorge Dely Valdes

References

Football at the 2017 Central American Games
2017 men